Silvester served as Greek Patriarch of Alexandria between 1569 and 1590.

References
 

16th-century Patriarchs of Alexandria
16th-century people from the Ottoman Empire